Mark Fisher (11 July 1968 – 13 January 2017), also known under his blogging alias k-punk, was an English writer, music critic, political and cultural theorist, philosopher, and teacher based in the Department of Visual Cultures at Goldsmiths, University of London. He initially achieved acclaim for his blogging as k-punk in the early 2000s, and was known for his writing on radical politics, music, and popular culture.

Fisher published several books, including the unexpected success Capitalist Realism: Is There No Alternative? (2009), and contributed to publications such as The Wire, Fact, New Statesman and Sight & Sound. He was also the co-founder of Zero Books, and later Repeater Books. He died by suicide in January 2017, shortly before the publication of The Weird and the Eerie (2017).

Early life and education
Fisher was born in Leicester and raised in Loughborough to working-class, conservative parents; his father was an engineer and his mother a cleaner. He attended a local comprehensive school. Fisher was formatively influenced in his youth by the post-punk music press of the late 1970s, particularly papers such as NME which crossed music with politics, film, and fiction. He was also influenced by the relationship between working class culture and football, being present at the Hillsborough disaster. Fisher earned a Bachelor of Arts degree in English and Philosophy at Hull University (1989), and completed a PhD at the University of Warwick in 1999 titled Flatline Constructs: Gothic Materialism and Cybernetic Theory-Fiction. During this time, Fisher was a founding member of the interdisciplinary collective known as the Cybernetic Culture Research Unit, which were associated with accelerationist political thought and the work of philosophers Sadie Plant and Nick Land. There, he befriended and influenced producer Kode9, who would later found the Hyperdub record label. In the early 1990s, he also made music as part of the techno group D-Generation, releasing the 12" Entropy in the UK.

After a period teaching in a further education college as a philosophy lecturer, Fisher began his blog on cultural theory, k-punk, in 2003. Music critic Simon Reynolds described it as "a one-man magazine superior to most magazines in Britain" and as the central hub of a "constellation of blogs" in which popular culture, music, film, politics, and critical theory were discussed in tandem by journalists, academics, and colleagues. Vice magazine later described his writing on k-punk as "lucid and revelatory, taking literature, music and cinema we're familiar with and effortlessly disclosing its inner secrets". Fisher used the blog as a more flexible, generative venue for writing, a respite from the frameworks and expectations of academic writing. Fisher also co-founded the message board Dissensus with writer Matt Ingram.

Career
Subsequently, Fisher was a visiting fellow and a lecturer on Aural and Visual Cultures at Goldsmiths College, a commissioning editor at Zero Books, an editorial board member of Interference: A Journal of Audio Culture and Edinburgh University Press's Speculative Realism series, and an acting deputy editor at The Wire. In 2009, Fisher edited The Resistible Demise of Michael Jackson, a collection of critical essays on the career and death of Michael Jackson, and published Capitalist Realism: Is There No Alternative?, an analysis of the ideological effects of neoliberalism on contemporary culture.

Fisher was an early critic of call-out culture and in 2013 published a controversial essay titled "Exiting the Vampire Castle". He argued that call-out culture created a space "where solidarity is impossible, but guilt and fear are omnipresent". Fisher also argued that call-out culture reduces every political issue to criticizing the behaviour of individuals, instead of dealing with such political issues through collective action. In 2014, Fisher published Ghosts of My Life: Writings on Depression, Hauntology and Lost Futures, a collection of essays on similar themes viewed through the prisms of music, film, and hauntology. He also contributed intermittently to a number of publications, including the music magazines Fact and The Wire. In 2016, Fisher co-edited a critical anthology on the post-punk era with Kodwo Eshun and Gavin Butt titled Post-Punk Then and Now, published by Repeater Books.

Capitalist realism

In the late 2000s, Fisher re-purposed the term "capitalist realism" to describe "the widespread sense that not only is capitalism the only viable political and economic system, but also that it is now impossible even to imagine a coherent alternative to it".
He expanded on the concept in his 2009 book Capitalist Realism: Is There No Alternative?, arguing that the term best describes the ideological situation since the fall of the Soviet Union, in which the logics of capitalism have come to delineate the limits of political and social life, with significant effects on education, mental illness, pop culture, and methods of resistance. The result is a situation in which it is "easier to imagine an end to the world than an end to capitalism." Fisher writes:

Capitalist realism as I understand it ... is more like a pervasive atmosphere, conditioning not only the production of culture but also the regulation of work and education, and acting as a kind of invisible barrier constraining thought and action.

As a philosophical concept, capitalist realism is influenced by the Althusserian conception of ideology, as well as the work of Fredric Jameson and Slavoj Žižek. The concept of capitalist realism also likely stems from the concept of Cultural hegemony proposed by Italian theorist, Antonio Gramsci; which can generally be described as the notion that the "status quo" is all there is, and that anything else violates common sense itself. Capitalists maintain their power not through violence or force, but by creating a pervasive sense that the Capitalist system is all there is. They maintain this view by dominating most social and cultural institutions. Fisher proposes that within a capitalist framework there is no space to conceive of alternative forms of social structures, adding that younger generations are not even concerned with recognizing alternatives. He proposes that the 2008 financial crisis compounded this position; rather than catalyzing a desire to seek alternatives for the existing model, the response to the crisis reinforced the notion that modifications must be made within the existing system. Fisher argues that capitalist realism has propagated a 'business ontology' which concludes that everything should be run as a business including education and healthcare.

Following the publication of Fisher's work, the term has been picked up by other literary critics.

Hauntology

Fisher popularised the use of Jacques Derrida's concept of hauntology to describe a pervasive sense in which contemporary culture is haunted by the "lost futures" of modernity, which failed to occur or were cancelled by postmodernity and neoliberalism. Fisher and others have drawn attention to the shift into post-Fordist economies in the late 1970s, which he argued has "gradually and systematically deprived artists of the resources necessary to produce the new". In contrast to the nostalgia and ironic pastiche of postmodern culture, Fisher defined hauntological art as exploring these impasses and representing a "refusal to give up on the desire for the future" and a "pining for a future that never arrived". Discussing the political relevance of the concept, Fisher wrote: At a time of political reaction and restoration, when cultural innovation has stalled and even gone backwards, when "power ... operates predictively as much as retrospectively" (Eshun 2003: 289), one function of hauntology is to keep insisting that there are futures beyond postmodernity's terminal time. When the present has given up on the future, we must listen for the relics of the future in the unactivated potentials of the past.
Fisher and critic Simon Reynolds adapted Derrida's concept to describe a musical trend in the mid-2000s. Fisher's 2014 book Ghosts of My Life examined these ideas through cultural sources, such as the music of Burial, Joy Division, and the Ghost Box label, TV series such as Sapphire & Steel, the films of Stanley Kubrick and Christopher Nolan, and the novels of David Peace and John le Carré.

The Weird and the Eerie
Fisher's posthumous book The Weird and the Eerie explores the titular concepts of "the weird" and "the eerie" through various works of art, defining the concepts as radical narrative modes or moments of "transcendental shock" which work to de-center the human subject and de-naturalise social reality, exposing the arbitrary forces that shape it. Summarizing Fisher's characterizations, Yohann Koshy stated that "weirdness abounds at the edge between worlds; eeriness radiates from the ruins of lost ones." The book includes discussion of science-fiction and horror sources such as the writing of H. P. Lovecraft, Joan Lindsay's 1967 Picnic at Hanging Rock, and Philip K. Dick, films such as David Lynch's Inland Empire (2006) and Jonathan Glazer's Under the Skin (2013), and the music of UK post-punk band The Fall and ambient musician Brian Eno.

Acid Communism
At the time of his death, Fisher was said to be planning a new book titled Acid Communism, excerpts of which were published as part of a Mark Fisher anthology, k-punk: The Collected and Unpublished Writings of Mark Fisher (2004–2016), by Repeater Books in November 2018. Acid Communism would have attempted to reclaim elements of the 1960s counterculture and psychedelia in the interest of imagining new political possibilities for the Left.

On Vanishing Land
Following Fisher's death, the Hyperdub record label started a sub label called Flatlines which published an audio-essay by Justin Barton and Fisher in July 2019. Fisher and Barton edited together music from various musicians which was made to accompany the text, and Barton, working in part with suggestions from Fisher, wrote the text for the audio-essay, which "evokes a walk along the Suffolk coastline in 2006, from Felixstowe container port ('a nerve ganglion of capitalism') to the Anglo-Saxon burial ground at Sutton Hoo". Both Barton and Fisher narrate the essay. Adam Harper wrote about the elements of Hauntology in On Vanishing Land, as well as its relation to the environmentalist movement. In a review for The Quietus, Johny Lamb referred to On Vanishing Land as a "shocking revelation of the proximity of dystopia."

Critique of political economy 
Fisher critiqued economics, claiming that it was a bourgeois "science", that molded reality after its presuppositions, rather than critically examined reality. As he stated it himself:

Death
Fisher hanged himself at his home on King Street, Felixstowe on 13 January 2017 at the age of 48, shortly before the publication of his latest book The Weird and the Eerie (2017). He had sought psychiatric treatment in the weeks leading up to his death, but his general practitioner had only been able to offer over-the-phone meetings to discuss a referral. Fisher’s mental health had deteriorated since May 2016, leading to a suspected overdose in December 2016, where he was admitted to Ipswich Hospital. He discussed his struggles with depression in articles and in his book Ghosts of My Life. According to Simon Reynolds in The Guardian, Fisher argued that "the pandemic of mental anguish that afflicts our time cannot be properly understood, or healed, if viewed as a private problem suffered by damaged individuals."

Legacy
Fisher has been posthumously acclaimed as a highly influential thinker and theorist. Commenting on Fisher's influence in Tribune, Alex Niven recalled that Fisher's "lucidity, but more than that, his ability to get to the heart of what was wrong with late-capitalist culture and right about the putative alternative...seemed to have cracked some ineffable code". In The Irish Times Rob Doyle wrote that "a more interesting British writer has not appeared in this century", while The Guardian described Fisher's k-punk blog posts as "required reading for a generation". In the Los Angeles Review of Books, Roger Luckhurst called Fisher "one of Britain's most trenchant, clear-sighted, and sparky cultural commentators...it is a catastrophe that we no longer have Mark Fisher". He still has a large influence on contemporary Zer0 Books writers, with him being cited extensively in Guy Mankowski's 'Albion's Secret History: Snapshots of England's Pop Rebels and Outsiders'. After Fisher's suicide, English musician the Caretaker, who had a symbiotic relationship with the writer, released Take Care. It's a Desert Out There... in memory of him, with its proceeds being donated to the mental health charity Mind.

Bibliography
 The Resistible Demise of Michael Jackson (editor). Winchester: Zero Books, 2009. 
 Capitalist Realism: Is There No Alternative?. Winchester: Zero Books, 2009. 
 Ghosts of My Life: Writings on Depression, Hauntology and Lost Futures. Winchester: Zero Books, 2014. 
 Post-Punk Then and Now (editor, with Gavin Butt and Kodwo Eshun). London: Repeater Books, 2016. 
 The Weird and the Eerie. London: Repeater Books, 2017. 
 Flatline Constructs: Gothic Materialism and Cybernetic Theory-Fiction (foreword by exmilitary). New York: Exmilitary Press, 2018. 
 k-punk: The Collected and Unpublished Writings of Mark Fisher (2004–2016) (edited by Darren Ambrose, foreword by Simon Reynolds). London: Repeater Books, 2018. 
 Postcapitalist Desire: The Final Lectures (edited and with an introduction by Matt Colquhoun). London: Repeater Books, 2020.

References

External links
 
 2012 podcast discussion with Mark Fisher – discussing issues relative to the recession, insurrection, and Really Existing Capitalism
 K-Punk Blog Archive – Mark Fishers "K-Punk" Blog
 Mark Fisher Tribute Site & Video Archive
 Dissensus forum

1968 births
2017 suicides
Suicides by hanging in England
English music journalists
English Marxists
British literary theorists
English bloggers
Alumni of the University of Hull
Alumni of the University of Warwick
British anti-capitalists
Academics of Goldsmiths, University of London
20th-century British journalists
21st-century British journalists
English political philosophers
British male bloggers
Critics of political economy
Accelerationism